People's Labor Union of Ukraine, NTSU is a political party of Ukraine of center-left type that was officially registered in 2006. It was not until 2012 the party started to participate in parliamentary elections. The party's flag is similar to the flag of Kingdom of Galicia and Lodomeria.

The party was registered right after its constituent congress that took place on April 11, 2006.

The second party congress took place in Luhansk on August 21, 2010. The congress elected Valentyn Zubov as the party's leader.

The third party congress was planning to take place in March 2011 in preparation to the 2012 Ukrainian parliamentary elections.

External links
Official website
Party profile
Party profile. Center of political information.

Labour parties in Ukraine
Political parties established in 2006